Hrvatica is a Croatian word of feminine gender meaning 'Croat'. It may refer to:

 Croatina, a grape variety
 Hrvatica chicken, a domestic chicken breed